Muse Sudi Yalahow (Arabic: موسى سودي يالاهو) was a Trade Minister in the Transitional Government of Ali Mohammed Ghedi. He was dismissed in June 2006 after ignoring government requests to halt fighting with the Islamic Courts Union militia.

Somali Civil War

Somali Reconciliation and Restoration Council (SRRC)

In December 2001 his forces lost control over the Jazira airstrip. He had split from his "right-hand man and deputy," Mahmud Muhammad Finish, who was also of the Da'ud subclan of the Abgal clan. Yalahow became a senior leader of the Somali Reconciliation and Restoration Council (SRRC), while Finish was loyal to the Transitional National Government (TNG) movement. The two battled over the control of the airstrip, as well as over control of sections of Mogadishu. On February 26, 2002, fighting broke out between the two warlords again, killing at least twelve people. Yalahow lost a technical and an unarmed pickup to Finish in the fighting.

Transitional Federal Government (TFG)

When the Transitional Federal Government (TFG) was organized in 2004, Musa Sudi Yalahow was one of the 275 selected members of the Transitional Federal Parliament enumerated in the official list of August 29, 2004. His term expires in 2009.

On March 20, 2005, it was reported Yalahow was arrested in Kenya, along with other TFG members of parliament for brawling over an argument which stemmed from the debate over whether to allow peacekeepers from Ethiopia, Djibouti and Kenya to help restore the TFG to power.

In October 2005, the Somali Transitional Federal Government ordered that Daynile be closed. Yalahow, though a Minister in the government, warned that he would shoot down any plane which followed the government's orders not to land there.

Alliance for the Restoration of Peace and Counter-Terrorism (ARPCT)

In February 2006 Yahalow joined the United States-backed warlord coalition, the Alliance for the Restoration of Peace and Counter-Terrorism (ARPCT) in order to fight the Islamic Court Union. Fighting between the ICU and ARPCT claimed more than 350 lives and Yalahow's militia occupied the International Red Cross and Red Crescent (ICRC)-run Kensaney hospital. 

On June, Yalahow withdrew from Mogadishu to the warlord stronghold of Balad, a town 30 km north of Mogadishu, which was also taken by the ICU days later.

The Somali Prime Minister, Ali Mohammed Ghedi removed Yalahow from office, saying Yalahow had opposed his government and peace initiatives and undermined their reconciliation activities. He said Yalahow's actions fueled violence and unrest and his militia had killed innocent civilians.

Return to Mogadishu

On January 6, 2007 YALAHOW returned to Mogadishu from exile.

On January, 2007, the same day as the Battle of Ras Kamboni ended marking the last major campaign to defeat the ICU, Somali warlords tentatively agreed with President Abdullahi Yusuf to disarm their militias and to direct their members to apply to join the national army or police forces. An estimated 20,000-30,000 militia were said to exist throughout Somalia, Somaliland. Mohamed Qanyare Afrah said the clans were "fed up" with militias and agreed to disarm his own men. 
Muse Sudi Yalahow was less conciliatory and made veiled threats that if dissatisfied, people might oppose the government.

On January, 2007, QANYARE Mohamed and SUDI YALAHOW, MOUSE, were the first warlords of Mogadishu to disarm, turning over their weapons and committing their militiamen to the government, though some of SUDI's arms remained in other locations controlled by QANYARE and M. DHERE. The arms were accepted by the chief commander of the government army, along with GENERAL  Brise, Naji  and other dignitaries.

See also 
Disarmament in Somalia
Alliance for the Restoration of Peace and Counter-Terrorism
Rise of the Islamic Courts
Cases before the International Criminal Court

References 

Somalian faction leaders
Living people
Members of the Transitional Federal Parliament
Government ministers of Somalia
Year of birth missing (living people)